Bracebridge and Muskoka Lakes Secondary School is a high school in Bracebridge, Ontario. It serves approximately 900 students, grades 9 through 12, from Bracebridge and surrounding areas in Muskoka; attached to it is the Bracebridge Sportsplex and the Rene M. Caisse Memorial Theatre.

BMLSS is one of seven secondary schools in the Trillium Lakelands District School Board, and is one of only two high schools in Bracebridge; the other is St. Dominic Catholic Secondary School.

Location
BMLSS is located at School, Bracebridge, Ontario, in the same building as the Bracebridge Sportsplex and the Rene M. Caisse Memorial Theatre. The facility completed construction in August 2007; and was opened the following month..The theatre is open to all students, and is used regularly by the dramatic arts classes. Much of the Sportsplex is available for use in phys ed. classes.

The facility was opened to replace the old high school, located in town, built in the early 1920s, as well as the old Bracebridge Culture and Recreation centre (the "Centennial Centre"), which was over 30 years old. The original high school was remodeled for residential use, while the Culture and Recreation centre was remodeled and became a Georgian College campus for Muskoka.

Special programs
BMLSS offers an Advanced Placement (AP) program, which allows students to potentially bypass a first-year credit in University; the school is one of only two in the district to offer this program. Grade 12 courses offering this include Physics, Biology, Chemistry, Functions, French, and English.

BMLSS also offers regular exchange programs to various countries around the world; the student may choose from one-month, three-month, or year-long exchanges.

The school also offers Specialist High Skills Major programs in construction, communications technology, transportation and health & wellness.

Teams and clubs
BMLSS teams compete in GBSSAA and OFSSAA regularly. 

Teams and groups include: fencing, soccer, basketball, gymnastics, hockey, curling, badminton, rugby, lacrosse, cross-country, track and field, nordic skiing, field hockey, swimming, and volleyball. Other clubs at BMLSS include their improv teams, chess club, Concert Band, Stage Band, Outers Club, and Reach Team, Fencing, Robotics, Character Education, Lakers Leadership Council, and Gay Straight Alliance (GSA) Club. All of the sporting teams both have Senior and Junior divisions separated by gender.

Lakers Leadership Council
In 2014 BMLSS retired the student parliament (SPAR) and replaced it with Lakers Leadership Council (LLC). The first year running the council was split into four divisions: social, academics, recreation, and communications. Each division had two co-chairs who ran members for their respective division. The following year they replaced that structure with one communal division and two co-chairs and one student administrator. 

LLC runs many events on campus including coffee houses, school dances, Relay For Life, Summerfest, Winterfest, spirit days, and many more.

See also
List of high schools in Ontario

References

External links
Official web site
Trillium Lakelands District School Board web site

Bracebridge, Ontario
High schools in the District Municipality of Muskoka
Educational institutions established in 1925
1925 establishments in Ontario